Albrecht Georg of Limburg (1660–1690) was a  count of Limburg and Bronckhorst. He was the fifth son of Otto of Limburg.

He married in 1684 Elisabeth Philippine van Boetzelaer (died 1692) and they had one daughter,

Maria, heiress of the county of Bronckhorst (1689–1759). She married in 1714 the Landgrave Philipp of Hesse-Philippsthal (died 1717).

Albrecht Georg died in 1690.

References
 Die Grafen von Limburg Stirum: Einleitung und abschliessender Band der Geschichte der Grafen Van Limburg Stirum und ihrer direkten Vorfahren; Günter Aders, J. P. J. Gewin; Van Gorcum, 1962.

1660 births
1690 deaths
Albrecht
Counts of Germany